Toren may refer to:

People
Carl-Axel Torén (1887–1961), a Swedish equestrian
Märta Torén (1925–1957), a Swedish actress
Toren Smith (1960-2013), a Canadian translator of manga

Fictional characters
Graf Toren, DC Comics character
Sandrilene fa Toren book character created by Tamora Pierce

Places and buildings
Toren van Goedereede
Toren de Vlinder
KEMA Toren
Koningin Juliana Toren
Nieuwe Toren, Kampen
Vesteda Toren

Works 
 Toren (video game), 2015 video game